Bocken Estate is a country estate in the municipality of Horgen of the Swiss canton of Zurich.  It is a Swiss heritage site of national significance.

From 1912 on Alfred Emil Schwarzenbach, a wealthy businessman in the silk industry and his wife Renée Schwarzenbach-Wille, horsewoman and amateur photographer, lived here with their family of five children. One of their daughters, novelist, travel journalist and photographer Annemarie Schwarzenbach grew up on the estate.

References

External links
 

Cultural property of national significance in the canton of Zürich
Castles in the canton of Zürich
Horgen